Annexin A2 also known as annexin II is a protein that in humans is encoded by the ANXA2 gene.

Annexin 2 is involved in diverse cellular processes such as cell motility (especially that of the epithelial cells), linkage of membrane-associated protein complexes to the actin cytoskeleton, endocytosis, fibrinolysis, ion channel formation, and cell matrix interactions.
It is a calcium-dependent phospholipid-binding protein whose function is to help organize exocytosis of intracellular proteins to the extracellular domain. Annexin II is a pleiotropic protein meaning that its function is dependent on place and time in the body.

Gene 

Multiple alternatively spliced transcript variants encoding different isoforms have been found for this gene.

Function 

This protein is a member of the annexin family. Members of this calcium-dependent phospholipid-binding protein family play a role in the regulation of cellular growth and in signal transduction pathways. This protein functions as an autocrine factor which heightens osteoclast formation and bone resorption. Epigenetic regulation of Annexin A2 has been identified as a key determinant of mesenchymal transformation in brain tumors.  Maternal deficiency of the ANXA2 gene contributes to shallow decidual invasion by placental cytotrophoblast cells. These findings highlight the maternal contribution to the pathogenesis of severe preeclampsia.

Annexin A2 has been proposed to function inside the cell in sorting of endosomes and outside the cell in anticoagulant reactions.

Interactions 

Annexin A2 has been shown to interact with Prohibitin, CEACAM1, S100A10, PCNA, complement Factor H, and a number of viral factors including the HPV16 minor capsid protein L2.

See also 
 Annexin

References

Further reading

External links 

 

Peripheral membrane proteins